The President of Serbia and Montenegro was the head of state of Serbia and Montenegro. From its establishment in 1992 until 2003, when the country was reconstituted as a confederacy (state union) via constitutional reform, the head of state was known as the President of the Federal Republic of Yugoslavia. With the constitutional reforms of 2003 and the merging of the offices of head of government and head of state, the full title of the president was President of Serbia and Montenegro and Chairman of the Council of Ministers of Serbia and Montenegro. In 2006 the office was abolished as the state union was dissolved, with Serbia and Montenegro becoming independent countries and was followed by Kosovo in 2008 although it received limited international recognition.

Authority
As head of state, the president had the power to

represent the country at home and abroad
appoint and recall heads of diplomatic and consular missions
receive letters of credence and recall from foreign diplomatic representatives
confer medals and other decorations
promulgate laws passed by the Parliament
call for parliamentary elections

In 2003, the powers of the president were extended to include the right to chair the Council of Ministers and propose the composition of the Council of Ministers to the parliament, effectively merging the powers of the head of government into the office. However, although the president became de jure both head of state and head of government, his role was largely limited because all the institutions were indirectly elected by confederal parliament, which was itself elected by parliaments of member states.

Elections

Under the 1992 constitution, the president was elected by the Federal Assembly of Yugoslavia for a four-year term. After the constitutional amendments of 2000, direct elections for the office of President were introduced. Under the 2003 constitution, the president was elected at the proposal of the president and vice president of the Parliament of Serbia and Montenegro for a four-year term. The president of Serbia and Montenegro was a member of the Supreme Defence Council together with the president of Serbia and the president of Montenegro.

The results of the direct presidential elections of 2000 were as follows:

Presidents
There were six presidents of FR Yugoslavia (two acting) after its assertion of independence from the Socialist Federal Republic of Yugoslavia (SFRY) in 1992 up until its dissolution in 2003. Svetozar Marović of the Democratic Party of Socialists of Montenegro was the only President of the FR Yugoslavia after its constitutional reforms and reconstitution as a confederacy. He was inaugurated on March 7, 2003. After the declaration of independence of Montenegro, on June 3, 2006, the president announced on June 4, 2006 the termination of his office.

Timeline

See also
 Politics of Serbia and Montenegro
 Prime Minister of Serbia and Montenegro
 List of heads of state of Yugoslavia
 President of Montenegro
 List of presidents of Montenegro
 President of Serbia
 List of presidents of Serbia

References

Serbia and Montenegro
 
1992 establishments in Yugoslavia
2006 disestablishments in Serbia and Montenegro